Panic in Paradise may refer to:

 Panic in Paradise (film), a 1960 Danish film
 Panic in Paradise: Florida's Banking Crash of 1926, a 2007 book by Vic Vickers
 Naughty Bear: Panic in Paradise, a 2012 video game, a sequel to Naughty Bear